Senator Venable may refer to:

Abraham B. Venable (1758–1811), U.S. Senator from Virginia from 1803 to 1804
Richard N. Venable (1756–1838), Virginia State Senate

See also
Robert Venables Sr. (born 1933), Delaware State Senate